Patricia W. "Pat" Jones (born January 31, 1950) is an American politician from Utah. A Democrat, she was a member of the Utah State Senate from 2006 to 2014, and currently runs the Women’s Leadership Institute in Utah. She is also senior adviser at Cicero Group, a research and strategy firm in Salt Lake City.

Personal life, education, and career
Jones has a bachelor's degree in journalism from the University of Utah. She was married to the late Dan E. Jones, who was a former pollster and political science professor at the University of Utah. They have four children and three step-children.

Jones was president of Dan Jones & Associates, a public opinion and market research firm incorporated in 1980. Pat Jones is professionally trained in qualitative research and as a focus group moderator. She received her training from the Oregon Research Institute. She is a member of the National Qualitative Research Consultants Association.

Background
Gov. Commission on Education 
Native American Liaison Interim Commission
Info Tech Steering Commission 
Boards: 
Salt Lake Chamber of Commerce 
United Way 
 St. Mark's Hospital 
 Hale Centre Theater 
 Women's Prosperity Network 
Intermountain Healthcare Foundation

Awards: 
Titan Business Excellence 
Legislator of the Year (UT Pharmacists Assn.) 
Athena Award 
U of U Alumni Achievement 
Public Health Hero 
Hero on the Hill (Coalition for People with Disabilities) 
Women on the Move (Utah Business) 
 Eleanor Roosevelt award 
 Friend of Children (PTA)

Political career
Jones represented the state's 4th senate district in Salt Lake County from 2006-2014. She previously served in the Utah House of Representatives from 2002 to 2006, representing District 40. In 2014, she served as the Assistant Minority Whip in the Utah Senate. She has also served as the minority leader. Jones serves on Health Committee of National Conference of State Legislatures. Senator Jones has also served on the United Way Board of Governors, Salt Lake Council for the Aging, Salt Lake Chamber of Commerce, South Valley Boys and Girls Club, and Understanding Chemical Addictions Boards. Throughout her political career, Senator Jones has been named the 2006 Hero on the Hill by the People with Disabilities, one of "30 Top Women in Business" by Utah Business Magazine 2002 and Utah's 2002 Public Health Hero by Utah Health Magazine.

In 2014, Senator Jones served on the following committees:
Executive Appropriations Committee
Higher Education Appropriations Subcommittee
Public Education Appropriations Subcommittee
Senate Economic Development and Workforce Services Committee
Senate Education Committee
Senate Ethics Committee
Senate Judiciary, Law Enforcement, and Criminal Justice Committee
Senate Rules Committee

Senator Jones sponsored S.B. 108 Civil Rights Amendments Relating to Persons with a Disability in 2013. This bill follows in the footsteps of the Americans with Disabilities Act of 1990 (ADA) by recognizing that, historically speaking, Utah and the United States have actively and passively discriminated against these individuals for no other reason than they are disabled.

Election results

2014 sponsored legislation

References

External links

Living people
University of Utah alumni
Politicians from Salt Lake City
Democratic Party Utah state senators
Women state legislators in Utah
1950 births
21st-century American politicians
21st-century American women politicians